Andrzej Szczypiorski (3 February 1928 – 16 May 2000) was a Polish novelist and politician. He served as a member of the Polish legislature, and was a Solidarity activist interned during the military crackdown of 1981. He was a secret police agent in the 1950s.

Life
Szczypiorski had a sister Wiesława (1924–1945). He spent his childhood in Warsaw.

During World War II Szczypiorski studied at an underground university called the "flying university" due to the regular changing of its location for safety. He was a partisan of the Polish People’s Army, and a participant of the Warsaw Uprising. After the Uprising he was arrested and condemned to imprisonment at the Sachsenhausen concentration camp, where he survived until 1945.

In 1946–1947 he studied political science in the Warsaw Consular Diplomatic Academy. In 1948–1956, Szczypiorski worked as an editor in the Katowice Silesian Theater.  During this period, in 1952, he made his literary debut in the magazine "Życie Literackie" using the pseudonym 'Maurice S. Andrews' and was inducted into the Polish Writers' Union. He won the Austrian State Prize for European Literature in 1988.

In 1956–1958, he was selected to serve in the Polish Embassy to Denmark, after which he returned to work as an editor on the radio and for publications. He later served as a member of the Polish legislature. He was also a UNICEF Goodwill Ambassador. Prior to his death, Szczypiorski converted to Calvinism, and is buried in the Protestant Reformed Cemetery in Warsaw.

After his death it became known that Szczypiorski was a collaborator of the Polish communist secret police in the years of Stalinism in Poland.

Publications 
Source:

 1961: Czas przeszły (The Past Time), Iskry, Warsaw.
 1966: Podróż do krańca doliny (Journey to the End of the Valley), Iskry, Warsaw.
 1967: Karol Świerczewski – Walter. W 20 rocznicę śmierci, ZG ZBoWiD, Krajowa Komisja Dąbrowszczaków: „Sport i Turystyka”, Warsaw.
 1968: Niedziela, godzina 21.10: wybór felietonów radiowych, 1964–1967, Czytelnik, Warsaw.
 1971: Msza za miasto Arras, Czytelnik, Warsaw.
 1980: Trzej ludzie w bardzo długiej podróży (Three People On A Very Long Journey), Czytelnik, Warsaw.
 1983: Z notatnika stanu wojennego, Polonia, London.
 1986: Początek (The Origin), Instytut Literacki, Paris.
 1990: Amerykańska whiskey i inne opowiadania (American Whiskey and Other Stories), Kantor Wydawniczy SAWW, Poznań.
 1991: Noc, dzień i noc (Night, Day and Night), Kantor Wydawniczy SAWW, Poznań.
 1994: Autoportret z kobietą (Autoportrait with a Woman), Kantor Wydawniczy SAWW, Poznań.
 1999: Gra z ogniem (Playing with Fire), Sens, Poznań.

Awards and honours
 1972: Polish PEN-Club Prize
 1988: Austrian State Prize for European Literature
 1989: Nelly Sachs Prize
 1994: Herder Prize
 1995: Pour le Mérite for Sciences and Arts
 1995: Order of Merit of the Federal Republic of Germany
 1997: Order of Polonia Restituta by the President of the Republic for his services to Poland

See also 
Polish literature
List of Polish writers

Notes

References 
 University of Silesia in Katowice University Gazette Article, 2000

1928 births
2000 deaths
Writers from Warsaw
Polish Calvinist and Reformed Christians
Converts to Calvinism
Polish male writers
Members of the Senate of Poland 1989–1991
Knights Commander of the Order of Merit of the Federal Republic of Germany
Recipients of the Pour le Mérite (civil class)
Herder Prize recipients
Armia Ludowa members
Warsaw Uprising insurgents
Sachsenhausen concentration camp survivors
Child soldiers in World War II